Silesian Museum in Katowice is a museum in the City of Katowice, Poland.

History 

The museum was founded in 1929 by the Silesian Sejm, while the region was recovering from the Silesian Uprisings. In the XX century interbellum, the Silesian Museum in Katowice was one of the biggest museums in Poland. The Germans-Nazis however brought the collection to Bytom and tore the building down in 1940. In 1984 the museum was reinstated in the former Grand Hotel. In 2015 a new seat was opened on the site of the former Katowice coal mine (See article in German or article in Polish) founded by Carl Lazarus Henckel von Donnersmarck including old extant buildings, but the primary exhibition space is underground in what was the mine.

Collection 

Permanent exhibitions cover:
 Upper Silesia over the course of history, presented in Polish, English, and German, and notably addressing sensitive issues such as the area's German cultural heritage and relationship with Germany – topics taboo under the Communist regime.
 Polish Art 1800–1945
 Gallery of non-Professional Art
 Polish Art after 1945
 On the trail of Tomek Wilmowski
 Sacred Art
 Silesian industry
 Laboratory of theatrical space
 Silesian industry in the arms production of the 19th–20th c.

Artists on display
Among the works of Polish art are remarkable examples portraits by Stanisław Wyspiański, paintings by Olga Boznańska, Henryk Rodakowski, Jan Matejko, Józef Chełmoński, Aleksander Gierymski, Jacek Malczewski, Leon Wyczółkowski, Józef Pankiewicz, Władysław Podkowiński, and Jan Stanisławski. Other artists on display from the original collection, returned from Bytom, are:

Jan Cybis
Henryk Derczynski
Tadeusz Makowski
Józef Mehoffer
Piotr Michałowski

Stanisław Witkiewicz
Witold Wojtkiewicz

More contemporary artists on display are: , Adam Marczyński, Andrzej Wróblewski, Tadeusz Kantor, Jerzy Nowosielski, Władysław Hasior, Zdzisław Beksiński, Lech Majewski, Zbigniew Libera, Natalia LL.

Gallery

References

Works and publications 
 
 Wojciech Janota: Katowice między wojnami. Miasto i jego sprawy 1922–1939. Łódź: Księży Młyn, 2010, s. 110, 111. .

External links
 
 The Silesian Museum: The Architecture of Identity

Museums established in 1929
Buildings and structures in Katowice
Silesian culture
Museums in Silesian Voivodeship
History museums in Poland
Art museums and galleries in Poland
Printing press museums
Military and war museums in Poland
Registered museums in Poland
Adaptive reuse of industrial structures in Poland
Tourist attractions in Katowice